The men's decathlon event at the 1998 Commonwealth Games was held on 17–18 September in Kuala Lumpur.

Results

References

Day 1 (part 1), Day 1 (part 2) results

Decathlon
1998